Kunar is a village in Salarpur block, Budaun district, Uttar Pradesh, India.Village code of Kunar is 128234.
As per the report of 2011 Census of India, The total population of the village is 1172, where 616 are males and 556 are females. The village is administrated by Gram Panchayat.

References

Villages in Budaun district